Joseph Stephenson-Jellie (1874–1960) was an Irish cricketer.  Stephenson-Jellie was born in Antrim, Ireland.

Joseph Stephenson-Jellie played six first-class matches for Gloucestershire, with his debut for the county coming in 1896 against Somerset and his final first-class match for the county coming against Essex in 1908.  In his six matches between 1896 and 1908, he scored 88 runs at a batting average of 8.80, with a high score of 27.

Stephenson-Jellie died in Australia in 1960.

References

External links
Joseph Stephenson-Jellie at Cricinfo
Joseph Stephenson-Jellie at CricketArchive

1874 births
1960 deaths
People from Antrim, County Antrim
Irish cricketers
Gloucestershire cricketers
Sportspeople from County Antrim